The Kinney Tobacco Company was an American cigarette manufacturing firm that created the Sweet Caporal cigarette brand and promoted it with collectible trading cards. Being a leading cigarette manufacturer of the 1870-1880s, it merged in 1890 into the American Tobacco Company.

History
During the Depression of 1873–79, the production of cigars, pipe, chewing and snuff tobacco in the United States mostly stagnated; however, the cigarette production, on the contrary, took off from 28 million in 1873—to 371 million in 1879. During the first post-depression 1880 year, 533 million cigarettes were manufactured. Until 1880 when James Albert Bonsack invented the first cigarette rolling machine, all cigarettes were rolled manually, on average about four cigarettes per minute by experienced workers. 

Seeing the commercial opportunity, Francis S. Kinney, a tobacco manufacturer and founder of the Kinney Tobacco Co. of New York who already experimented with hand-rolled cigarettes starting from 1869, channeled his energies into the mass production of cigarettes with a blend of Turkish and Virginia tobacco in his factories in New York City and Richmond, Virginia. Kinney even invited experienced cigarette-rollers from Europe to serve as instructors. Kinney Tobacco Co. sold cigarettes under the brands of Full Dress, Sweet Caporal, Kinney’s Straight Cut and Sportsman’s  Caporal in addition to already established Sweet Caporal Smoking Tobacco. Francis Kinney was joined in business by his brother, Abbot Kinney and the firm became known as Kinney Brothers Tobacco Company. 

In the 1870s, Kinney Tobacco Co. along with Allen & Ginter, Goodwin & Co.,  W.S. Kimball & Co., Marburg Brothers & Co., and F. W. Felgner & Son Co. formed the Big Six of the American cigarette industry; these six tobacco firms jointly controlled 75 percent of the national cigarette business. In 1887, Francis S. Kinney patented an apparatus for delivering packages of cigarettes and a machine for applying saliva-proof mouth pieces to cigarettes (with W. H. Butler), as well as distinctive designs for company's cigarette boxes and cigarette cases. In 1890, Kinney brothers received $5 million in stock after merging their firm into the American Tobacco Company, which acquired control of 90 percent of the cigarette market in the country establishing a corporate trust with near monopoly on cigarette production.

1892 fire
The Kinney Tobacco Co. production facility in New York City was housed in a row of buildings stretching from 515 to 525 West 22nd Street. Additionally, at 513 West 22nd Street there was a salesroom and at No. 529—a five-story building of the packing department built in 1888. The facility on West 22nd Street was known to be able to manufacture 18,000,000 cigarettes weekly.

On October 6, 1892, the Kinney's production and logistics complex on West 22nd Street was gutted by a five-alarm fire. It was supposed that the fire originated around 5:30 a.m. in the basement storage area of the four-story brick building, address No. 521-525 West 22nd Street, from a gas leak that was ignited by a gas-powered chandelier (gasalier). Later, it spread to a five-story brick building No. 527-529 West 22d Street, and onto four-story brick building No. 513 West 22d Street. 

An estimated 40,000,000 cigarettes were destroyed by flame and/or water damage. The loss was estimated at $350,000; later it was adjusted to $243,618.56. Due to the early morning timing of the fire, no one was injured.

Sweet Caporal

Sweet Caporal launched as a brand in 1878, persevered through a merger and survived the subsequent dissolution of a cigarette trust after United States v. American Tobacco Co. It turned into a money making brand for the reconstituted American Tobacco Company on a par with Pall Mall and Mecca. In the beginning of the 20th century, it became especially popular in Canada. American Tobacco Company entered the Canadian market in 1895 by acquiring the Montreal-based American Cigarette Company and D. Ritchie & Co. forming the American Tobacco Company of Canada, Ltd. In 1908, when American Tobacco Company of Canada was bought out by the Imperial Tobacco Company of Canada, Sweet Caporal cigarettes commanded a 50-percent share of the Canadian market; the brand continued in Canada until 2011.

Sweet Caporal cigarette cards
The original N-series of the Kinney Bro's High Class Cigarettes cards issued in 1880s, including Sweet Caporal brand, featured multiple topics: Actresses, Animals, Military, Fish, Famous Gems of the World,  Famous Running Horses, Novelties, Naval Vessels of the World, Butterflies of the World, Flags of All Nations, and Surf Beauties, among others. In the 20th century, Sweet Caporal cigarette cards of the T-series featured baseball and other new themes including 1910 T206 Honus Wagner trading card described by the National Baseball Hall of Fame as the sport’s "most famous collectible."

See also
 American Tobacco Company
 Abbot Kinney

References

Further reading
 Patrick G. Porter. Origin of the American Tobacco Company, The Business History Review, Vol. 43, No. 1 (Spring, 1969), pp. 59-76.

External links

 A view from Narragansett: Kinney Bungalow, the party house built by a tobacco tycoon, Providence Journal, October 4, 2014.

Tobacco companies of the United States
K
Defunct companies based in New York (state)
Companies based in New York City